State Road 416 (SR 416) is an east–west state road signed on part of Silver Star Road, in northwestern Orlando, Florida, United States.

History
SR 416 was created around 1990 when SR 438 was moved from Silver Star Road to the new Princeton Street extension, and the old alignment needed a number.

Major intersections

References

External links

416
416